Kang Ju-Ho  (born 26 March 1989) is a South Korean footballer who plays as a midfielder for Chungju Hummel in the K League Challenge.

External links 

1989 births
Living people
Association football midfielders
South Korean footballers
Jeonbuk Hyundai Motors players
Chungju Hummel FC players
K League 1 players
K League 2 players
Kyung Hee University alumni